The men's 75 kilograms event at the 2002 Asian Games was held on October 4 and October 6, 2002 at the Busan Citizens' Hall in Busan, South Korea.

Schedule
All times are Korea Standard Time (UTC+09:00)

Results

Preliminary round

Final round

References

Preliminary Round
Final Round

Men's 75 kg